Snihur, also transliterated Snigur, is a Ukrainian surname meaning "bullfinch" (Pyrrhula). Notable people with the surname include:

 Daria Snigur (born 2002) Ukrainian tennis player
 Yevgeniya Snihur (born 1984), Ukrainian track and field athlete

See also
 
 Snegur, a related surname

Ukrainian-language surnames